Xili Reservoir is a reservoir located in Xili Subdistrict, Nanshan District, in the southwest of Shenzhen.

History
Construction began in December 1959 and completed in March 1960. It belongs to the first grade water source protection area and is part of Shenzhen's water supply network. The reservoir provides drinking water and water for irrigation. The reservoir discharges into Dasha River which empties into the South China Sea in Shenzhen Bay.

Public Access  
It is not open to the public.

Transportation
 Take bus No. 36 or 226 to Xili Zoo Bus Stop

See also
 List of lakes and reservoirs in Shenzhen

References

Reservoirs in Shenzhen
1960 establishments in China
Nanshan District, Shenzhen